East Grand Rapids is a city in Kent County in the U.S. state of Michigan.  As of the 2010 census, the population was 10,694.

The city is part of the Grand Rapids metropolitan area and is surrounded by Grand Rapids and Grand Rapids Township, but the city is administered autonomously.

History

East Grand Rapids was first settled in the early 1830s by the Reed Family from New York, New York. Miss Sophia Reed and Miss Euphemia Davis opened a school in 1834 near Reeds Lake.

Another schoolhouse was constructed in 1835 near Reeds Lake in the Grand River Valley, with Francis Prescott as its teacher. Originally part of Paris Township, South of Hall Street, and Grand Rapids Township, North of Hall Street, residents voted to establish the Village of East Grand Rapids in 1891. The village was incorporated into a Home Rule City in 1926 when the population was approximately 1,300.

By the 1870s, the Reeds Lake area was a popular summertime day trip destination for the people of Grand Rapids and surrounding areas. Picnicking, boating, swimming and spending a leisurely day at the lake and park were enjoyable pastimes.

The first lakeside pavilion was seen as early as 1879 on the west shore of Reeds Lake. Here viewers could take in a play or listen to a popular orchestra of the day. Originally, those who wished to reach Reeds Lake would do so by foot, stagecoach or by horse and buggy. In the middle 1870s, horse-drawn cars became available. Passengers would board in downtown Grand Rapids, transfer onto the Grand Rapids & Reeds Lake Railway on Sherman Street SE and proceed to the lake down Wealthy Street. By 1877 a steam locomotive replaced the horse cars. Electric streetcars came into use in the early 1890s. They were replaced by buses as a mode of transportation in 1935. Interurban also brought residents from nearby cities to Reeds Lake.

Ramona Park, an amusement park owned and operated by the Grand Rapids Street Railway Company, was a destination spot for thousands of families between 1897 and 1955. It was very common in those days for a public transportation company to own parks like it. They were known as trolley parks, and were placed at the end of the line to attract or encourage the use of the public transportation system. The Ramona Theatre Pavilion was built in 1897 on the West Side of the Park on Lakeside Drive, overlooking Reeds Lake. It was an extremely popular summertime venue that could seat 1,700 people. Popular plays, musicals, Vaudevillian and burlesque acts, silent films, talkies and favorite local and national entertainers, such as Will Rogers, appeared at the theater during its heyday. The theater was torn down in 1949 and the site is now occupied by the Lakewood Hills apartments. Into the 1950s, the Ramona Show Boat, a paddle wheel steam boat, circled the lake during live shows. When Ramona Park was replaced with a shopping center and apartment complex, the showboat was removed to Lowell, Michigan.

Reeds Lake itself was home to two bathing beaches. Manhattan Beach was located on the north shore of the lake at the end of Pioneer Club Road and was in service from the mid-1880s to 1927. In 1884 Charles Seidel, boat builder and harbormaster on Reeds Lake, thought the property would be a fine spot for a bathing beach. He leased the land for just this purpose. The property was then purchased and developed into a more substantial beach resort by Thomas Reed in 1905. His family continued to operate the facility after he died. His daughter and her husband, Katherine and Charles Morgan, ran the facility until it closed and the property was sold in 1927.

Rose's Bathing Beach and Swimming School located on the west shore of Reeds Lake on the north side of the boat launch, was established in 1901 by James Rose. German-born Rose had his own unique style of teaching people to swim. Hundreds learned under his tutelage. In addition to the bathing school and beach, there was a bathhouse and 'hamburger joint'. In the winter, when the lake was frozen, Rose's had a toboggan run, skating rink and ice hockey league. In the winters the bathhouse was crowded with skaters changing in and out of street shoes and indulging in Rose's famous caramel corn. After the bathing beach closed in the late 1960s, most of the facility was demolished. One small building was left standing. James' son John "Bub" Rose kept it open as a marina and an upscale restaurant noted for its hamburgers and caramel corn. "Bub" eventually retired to the Upper Peninsula of Michigan to pursue his passion for ice boating, selling the restaurant to the Gilmore Collection, owner of several area restaurants.

In 1974 East Grand Rapids came to national attention as the legal domicile of Gerald R. Ford, 38th President of the United States, although, as a serving Congressman and Vice-President, Ford had, for all practical purposes, resided in the District of Columbia area for the previous twenty-five years.

Reconstruction 
A local developer (Jade Pig) completed a new retail center as part of a $50 million project, which also will include offices and multi-floor condominium buildings spread over a  tract. In 2006, the City of East Grand Rapids performed a $3 million refurbishing of Wealthy Street with new paving, lighting and decorative features. A new 27,700ft2 (2573.41 m2) library was opened in August 2006 at the site of the previous library on Reeds Lake next to the Grand Rapids Yacht Club.

Geography

Reeds Lake and Fisk Lake comprise most of the water area.

Education
East Grand Rapids Public Schools is composed of
East Grand Rapids High School
East Grand Rapids Middle School
Wealthy Elementary
Breton Downs Elementary
Lakeside Elementary

Government
East Grand Rapids has a council–manager government, with an elected commission composed of six elected Commissioners, two from each of the city's three wards, and a mayor, elected at-large. Elections occur in odd years.

In the United States House of Representatives, East Grand Rapids is located in Michigan's 3rd congressional district, represented by Democrat Hilary Scholten.

Demographics

2010 census
As of the 2010 census, there were 10,694 people, 3,818 households, and 3,009 families residing in the city. The racial makeup of the city was 95.4% White, 1.1% African American, 0.1% Native American, 1.5% Asian, 0.2% from other races, and 1.6% from two or more races. Hispanic or Latino of any race were 1.5% of the population.

There were 3,818 households, of which 44.9% had children under the age of 18 living with them, 68.4% were married couples living together, 8.2% had a female householder with no husband present, 2.2% had a male householder with no wife present, and 21.2% were non-families. 17.9% of all households were made up of individuals, and 6.7% had someone living alone who was 65 years of age or older. The average household size was 2.80 and the average family size was 3.21.

The median age in the city was 39.8 years. 31.6% of residents were under the age of 18; 5% were between the ages of 18 and 24; 22.5% were from 25 to 44; 31.4% were from 45 to 64; and 9.7% were 65 years of age or older. The gender makeup of the city was 48.3% male and 51.7% female.

2000 census
As of the census of 2000, there were 10,764 people, 3,835 households, and 3,021 families residing in the city. The racial makeup of the city was 96.99% White, 0.98% African American, 0.13% Native American, 0.99% Asian, 0.01% Pacific Islander, 0.32% from other races, and 0.59% from two or more races. Hispanic or Latino of any race were 0.85% of the population.

There were 3,835 households, out of which 46.0% had children under the age of 18 living with them, 68.7% were married couples living together, 8.5% had a female householder with no husband present, and 21.2% were non-families. 18.2% of all households were made up of individuals, and 7.5% had someone living alone who was 65 years of age or older. The average household size was 2.81 and the average family size was 3.23.

In the city, the population was spread out, with 32.5% under the age of 18, 4.6% from 18 to 24, 27.4% from 25 to 44, 25.4% from 45 to 64, and 10.1% who were 65 years of age or older. The median age was 37 years. For every 100 females, there were 92.1 males. For every 100 females age 18 and over, there were 87.7 males.

The median income for a household in the city was $84,772, and the median income for a family was $98,967. Males had a median income of $66,528 versus $42,383 for females. The per capita income for the city was $41,388. About 1.5% of families and 2.8% of the population were below the poverty line, including 2.2% of those under age 18 and 2.9% of those age 65 or over.

Notable people
 Jim Boylen, former head coach of the NBA's Chicago Bulls and former head coach of the Utah Utes men's basketball team.
 Betty Ford, former First Lady of the United States.
 Gerald Ford, 38th President of the United States.
 Steven Ford, actor and son of Gerald Ford.
 William George, professor of management practice at Harvard Business School and former chairman and chief executive officer of Medtronic.
 Luke Glendening, professional hockey player.
 Adam Herz, writer for the film American Pie (the movie was based on his high school)  Emmy Award- and Peabody Award-winning journalist.
 David Howitt, author of Heed Your Call and founder and CEO of The Meriwether Group.
 Luke Jensen, professional tennis athlete.
 Laura Kasischke, National Book Critics Circle Award winner, poet, novelist.
 Tom Lehman, professional golfer.
 David T. McLaughlin, former president of Dartmouth College and former president and chief executive officer of the Aspen Institute.
 Peter F. Secchia, former U.S. Ambassador to Italy.
 L. William Seidman, economist, financial commentator, and former head of the U.S. Federal Deposit Insurance Corporation.
 Gillian Sorensen, senior advisor at the United Nations Foundation and former U.N. Assistant Secretary-General for External Relations.
 Chris Van Allsburg, author of the children's book The Polar Express.
 Brian Vander Ark, singer/songwriter, former lead singer of the Verve.

References

External links

East Grand Rapids official website

 
Cities in Kent County, Michigan
Grand Rapids metropolitan area
1891 establishments in Michigan
Populated places established in 1891